Tommy Ryan  was an Irish sportsperson. He played hurling with his local club Thurles Sarsfields and with the Tipperary senior inter-county team in the 1940s and 1950s. He won three All Ireland Senior hurling titles with Tipperary, starting in the half forward position in the 1949 final against Laois. He was a used substitute in the 1950 final against Kilkenny, and an unused substitute in the 1951 final against Wexford.

Honours

Tipperary
All-Ireland Senior Hurling Championship:
Winner (3): 1949, 1950, 1951
Munster Senior Hurling Championship:
Winner (3): 1949, 1950, 1951
National Hurling League:
Winner (2): 1948-1949, 1949–1950

References

Year of birth missing
Year of death missing
All-Ireland Senior Hurling Championship winners
Munster inter-provincial hurlers
Thurles Sarsfields hurlers
Tipperary inter-county hurlers